Dead Air Silencers is an American manufacturing company best known for their silencers.

History 
Dead Air Silencers was founded in 2014 by Mike Pappas and Todd Magee, both formerly of SilencerCo. They manufacture products for military, police, and civilian sales. Some of their silencers are intended for hunting use.

In the beginning they focused on the multicaliber silencer market producing silencers designed to be used with a number of different calibers. This due to the requirements of US commercial customers who must procure a different Bureau of Alcohol, Tobacco, Firearms and Explosives tax stamp for each silencer they own. Their first silencer was the Sandman series.

In 2018 Dead Air introduced Key-Mo, an adaptor which allows the use of Silencerco silencers with Dead Air muzzle devices.

Products

Muzzle devices
 Pyro, muzzle brake

Silencers
 Odessa-9
 Primal, .46-caliber magnum rated
 Sandman, multiple variants
 Wolverine PBS-1, based on the Soviet PBS-1 silencer
 Mask HD
 Ghost-M, designed to mitigate first round pop

Other
 “Heat Model” Colt 733 Enhanced Clone Package, a collaboration with Noveske Rifleworks based on a gun used in Heat (1995 film) and modeled on the Colt 733

Users 
 United States Navy SEALs

References 

Defense companies of the United States